Magreglio (Valassinese  ) is a small town in the province of Como, Lombardy, Italy.

Twin towns
  Friedberg, Germany

References

Cities and towns in Lombardy